Dalton James (born March 19, 1971) is an American actor. He was born in Sacramento, California.

Biography 
Dalton played the role of Hank Bennett on Passions and the role of Mark Reese on Beverly Hills, 90210. He was also in the movie My Father the Hero.  He was introduced in the last episode of MacGyver as MacGyver's long-lost son.  He also played on Crossroads with Robert Urich.  In 1999, he played Sunny in the movie Held Up.

Filmography

References

External links 

1971 births
Living people
American male soap opera actors
20th-century American male actors
21st-century American male actors
Male actors from Sacramento, California